Saint Henwg of Caerlleon upon Usk was a 5th-century saint and church builder.

Family
Henwg was a pre-congregational saint of Wales, born about 487. His father was reputed to have been Umbrafel son of Budoc and his mother, Afrelia the daughter of Vortimer Fendigaid, a son of Vortigen and Severa Verch Macsen.

His brother is said to be Maglor Ap Umbraphel (485-575), and another Unknown sibling.

Life
He was reputed to be from Caerleon in South Wales and legend associates him with King Arthur and Constantine the Great. Very little is factually known of his life: most of what is known come from the songs of Taliesin the bard, his son who built a Church in his memory at Llanbenwg. He is recorded as having gone on a mission to Rome to ask the Roman Emperor to send Saint Germanus and Saint Lupus to assist in the Christianisation of Britain.

References

Medieval Welsh saints
Year of birth unknown